The Hakomi Method is a form of mindfulness-centered somatic psychotherapy developed by Ron Kurtz in the 1970s.

Approach and method
According to the Hakomi Institute website, the method is an experiential psychotherapy modality, wherein present, felt experience is used as an access route to core material; this unconscious material is elicited and surfaces experientially, and changes are integrated into the client's immediate experience. Hakomi combines Western psychology, systems theory, and body-centered techniques with the principles of mindfulness and nonviolence drawn from Eastern philosophy.

Hakomi is grounded in five principles:
 mindfulness
 nonviolence:
 organicity
 unity
 body-mind holism

These five principles are set forth in Kurtz's book, Body Centered Psychotherapy. Some Hakomi leaders add two more principles, truth and mutability.

The Hakomi Method regards people as self-organizing systems, organized psychologically around core memories, beliefs, and images; this core material expresses itself through habits and attitudes around which people unconsciously organize their behavior. The goal is to transform their way of being in the world through working with core material and changing core beliefs.

Hakomi relies on mindfulness of body sensations, emotions, and memories. Although many therapists now recommend mindfulness meditation to support psychotherapy, Hakomi is unique in that it conducts the majority of the therapy session in mindfulness.

The Hakomi Method follows this general outline:

 Create healing relationship: Client and therapist work to build a relationship that maximizes safety and the cooperation of the unconscious. This includes practicing "loving presence", a state of acceptance and empathic resonance.
 Establish mindfulness: The therapist helps clients study and focus on the ways they organize experience. Hakomi's viewpoint is that most behaviors are habits automatically organized by core material; therefore, studying the organization of experience is studying the influence of this core material.
 Evoke experience: Client and therapist make direct contact with core feelings, beliefs, and memories using "experiments in mindfulness"—gentle somatic and verbal techniques to safely "access" the present experience behind the client's verbal presentation, or to explore "indicators": chronic physical patterns, habitual gestures, bodily tension, etc.
 Processing: This process usually evokes deeper emotions and/or memories, and if the client feels ready, the therapist helps them deepen into these, often using state-specific processing such as "working with the child" and/or strong emotions. The client is helped to recognize the core beliefs as they emerge, and the therapist often provides what Kurtz called "the missing experience", a form of "memory re-consolidation" where the child, as they revisit the negative experience(s) that generated their core beliefs, now receives the nourishment and support that was needed at the time. This supports the process of transformation of core beliefs. The same process may be used working with the adult rather than the "child state".
 Transformation: The client has an experience in therapy different from the one they had as a child (or are having as an adult) and experientially realizes that new healing experiences are possible and begins to be open to these experiences.
 Integration: Client and therapist work to make connections between the new healing experiences and the rest of the client's life and relationships.

Other components of the Hakomi Method include the sensitivity cycle, techniques such as "contact and tracking", "prompts" and "taking over", "embracing resistance", and developing a greater sensitivity to clients and how to work with their individual issues based on character typology originated by Alexander Lowen.

Related therapies
The Hakomi Institute describes itself as an international nonprofit organization founded in 1981 that teaches Hakomi therapy worldwide. Its website includes an international directory of Hakomi practitioners. The institute's programs focus on training psychotherapists and professionals in related fields. Its faculty are mainly professional psychotherapists who base their teaching of the Hakomi Method on current discoveries in neuroscience and on their own clinical insights. The Hakomi Institute is a professional member of the Association for Humanistic Psychology, the U.S. Association for Body Psychotherapists, and an accredited Continuing Education provider for the National Board for Certified Counselors and the National Association of Social Workers.

Ron Kurtz left the Hakomi Institute in the 1990s to create a new organization, Ron Kurtz Trainings. With a new group, he developed the Hakomi Method in new directions, offering training for both professionals and laypeople. He called the refined version of his work Hakomi Assisted Self-Discovery.

Both versions of the Hakomi Method are based in loving presence, mindfulness, somatics, and the other principles described above, and fall within the definition of body psychotherapy.

Another technique based on the Hakomi Method is Sensorimotor psychotherapy, developed by Pat Ogden.

Validation
Body psychotherapy has been scientifically validated by the European Association for Psychotherapy (EAP) as having a number of modalities within this branch of psychotherapy. Hakomi Therapy is one of the approaches or modalities within Body Psychotherapy recognized by the EAP.

Notes

Sources

Further reading
 The Herald (22 September 2004) Hakomi is the topic. Page 15.
 Johanson, Gregory. (22 June 2006) Annals of the American Psychotherapy Association. A survey of the use of mindfulness in psychotherapy. Volume 9; Issue 2; Page 15.
 Marshall, Lisa. (15 October 2001) Daily Camera The power of touch. Body psychotherapy sees massage, movement as adjunct to counseling. Section: Fit; Page C1
 Sutter, Cindy. (21 June 2004) Daily Camera Healing the body and the mind Hakomi helps clients heal with mindfulness. Section: Fit; Page D1.

Books 
 Weiss, Johanson, Monda, editors. Hakomi Mindfulness-Centered Somatic Psychotherapy: A Comprehensive Guide to Theory and Practice, 2015, Norton, NY. Foreword by Richard C. Schwartz, .
 Benz, Dyrian and Halko Weiss. To The Core of Your Experience, Luminas Press, 1989, preface by Ron Kurtz.
 Fisher, Rob. Experiential Psychotherapy With Couples: A Guide for the Creative Pragmatist. Phoenix, AZ: Zeig, Tucker & Theisen, 2002, foreword by Ron Kurtz. .
 Johanson, Greg and Kurtz, Ron. Grace Unfolding, Psychotherapy in the Spirit of the Tao Te Ching, New York: Bell Tower, 1991.
 Kurtz, Ron and Prestera, Hector. The Body Reveals: An Illustrated Guide to the Psychology of the Body, New York: Harper&Row/Quicksilver Books, 1976.
 Kurtz, Ron: Hakomi Therapy, Boulder, CO: 1983.
 Kurtz, Ron: Body-Centered Psychotherapy: The Hakomi Method. Mendecino: LifeRhythm, 1990..

Chapters
 Caldwell, Christine, ed. Getting in Touch: The Guide to New Body-Centered Therapies. Wheaton: Quest Books, 1997. See ch. 3 by Ron Kurtz and Kukuni Minton on "Essentials of Hakomi Body-Centered Psychotherapy", pp. 45–60, and ch. 9 by Pat Ogden on "Hakomi Integrated Somatics: Hands-On Psychotherapy", pp. 153–178.
 Capuzzi, David and Douglas Gross, eds. Counseling and Psychotherapy: Theories and Interventions. 4th ed. Upper Saddle River, NJ: Merrill Prentice Hall, 2003: See Donna M. Roy "Body-Centered Counseling and Psychotherapy", pp. 360–389.
 Cole, J. David and Carol Ladas-Gaskin. Mindfulness Centered Therapies: An Integrative Approach. Seattle, WA: Silver Birch Press, 2007.
 Menkin, Dan. Transformation through Bodywork: Using Touch Therapies for Inner Peace. Santa Fe, New Mexico: Bear & Company, 1996. See especially ch. 15 on "The Tao Te Ching and the Principle of Receptivity", pp. 119–128.
 Morgan, Marilyn. The Alchemy of Love: Personal Growth Journeys in Psychotherapy Training. VDM Verlag, Saarbrücken, Germany, 2008.
 Schaefer, Charles E., ed. Innovative Interventions in Child and Adolescent Therapy. New York: John Wiley & Sons, 1988. See Greg Johanson and Carol Taylor, "Hakomi Therapy with Seriously Emotionally Disturbed Adolescents," pp. 232–265.
 Staunton, Tree. Body Psychotherapy. New York: Taylor & Francis, 2002. See Philippa Vick, "Psycho-Spiritual Body Psychotherapy", pp. 133–147.

External links

 Hakomi Education Network website
 Hakomi Institute website
 Ron Kurtz website

Psychotherapies
Body psychotherapy
Mindfulness